In Roman Catholicism, a black veil is the traditional sign of a professed nun. Some monasteries or communities bestow the black veil at the first profession of vows, but usually it is bestowed with the profession of solemn vows. 

While the first vows could be made in a canonical hour, usually Vespers, or in a separate ceremony,
the solemn vows of a nun are made in a Holy Mass. After the introductory rites of the Mass and directly before the vows are made, the nun will lie prostrate as the community and all in the church pray over her, present her vows, signed upon the altar, to the bishop and profess her vows to the abbess or prioress of the monastery. When the vows have been professed the white veil of a novice will be swapped for the black veil of the professed, and she is usually crowned with a wreath of flowers.

See also 
 Christian headcovering

References

Religious headgear
Catholic religious clothing